Jusheqan-e Estark (also Romanized as Jūsheqān-e Estark, Jūsheqān Estark, Jooshqan Estarak, Jowsheqan-e Estark, Jowsheqān Estark, and Jūsheqān-e Estarak; also known as Jūsheqān and Jūshqān) is a village in Kuhpayeh Rural District, in the Central District of Kashan County, Isfahan Province, Iran. At the 2006 census, its population was 1,952, in 523 families.

References 

Populated places in Kashan County